Samborsko  is a village in the administrative district of Gmina Jastrowie, within Złotów County, Greater Poland Voivodeship, in west-central Poland. It was founded in 1580 and had a church.

Before 1945 the area was part of Prussia and later Germany. For the history of the region, see History of Pomerania and Territorial changes of Poland after World War II.

The village has a population of 480.

Notable residents
 Michael Christoph Hanow (1695-1773), German scientist
 Gerhard Janensch (1860–1933), German sculptor and medailleur

References

Samborsko